Sveindís Jane Jónsdóttir (born 5 June 2001) is an Icelandic footballer who plays for Frauen-Bundesliga club VfL Wolfsburg and the Icelandic national team.

In 2020, she won the Icelandic championship with Breiðablik, while also being named the Úrvalsdeild Player of the Year and winning the Úrvalsdeild Golden Boot award. In 2021, she was named the Icelandic Women's Footballer of the Year and in 2022, she won the Frauen-Bundesliga with VfL Wolfsburg.

Club career
Sveindís debuted with Keflavík's first team in 2015. During the 2016 season, she scored 27 goals in 19 games in the 1. deild kvenna. In 2018, she helped Keflavík to a second-place finish in the 1. deild and promotion to the top-tier Úrvalsdeild kvenna after scoring 9 goals in 18 matches.

In December 2019, Sveindís was loaned to Breiðablik. She helped Breiðablik finish first in the Úrvalsdeild in 2020 and was named the Player of the Year as well as winning the Golden Boot award after leading the league with 14 goals, same as teammate Agla María Albertsdóttir but in fewer minutes.

In December 2020, Sveindís signed with VfL Wolfsburg. She was immediately loaned to Kristianstads DFF to gain experience. On 18 April 2021, she scored after 11 minutes in her first match with Kristianstads in the Damallsvenskan. In her second match, she scored one goal and assisted on another in Kristianstads' 2–1 win against Djurgården. On 30 April she injured her knee in a game against Växjö DFF after her foot got stuck in the hybrid grass and was carried from the PITCH on a stretcher. She was later ruled out for at least 6 weeks. On 5 May it was announced that she had been named the Damallsvenskan Player of the Month for March. In December 2021, she was named the Icelandic Women's Footballer of the Year.

On 29 January 2022, Sveindís debuted in the Frauen-Bundesliga. In her first start, on 11 March 2022, she scored two goals in a 5–1 victory against 1. FC Köln. In May 2022, she won the Bundesliga with  Wolfsburg.

International career
Sveindís was selected to the Icelandic national team for the first time ahead of its game against Latvia on 17 September 2020. She started the match and scored Iceland's second goal on 8 minute. She later added another goal on 32 minute in Iceland's 9–0 victory. On 23 September she set up Iceland's goal in a 1–1 tie against Sweden.

International goals
As of match played 8 November 2020. Iceland score listed first, score column indicates score after each Sveindís Jane Jónsdóttir goal.

Personal life
Sveindís was born in Keflavík, Iceland, to an Icelandic father and a Ghanaian mother and raised in Keflavík.

Honours

Club
Breiðablik
Winner
 Icelandic Champion: 2020

VfL Wolfsburg
Winner
 Frauen-Bundesliga: 2022

Individual
 Úrvalsdeild Player of the Year: 2020
 Úrvalsdeild Golden Boot: 2020
 Icelandic Women's Footballer of the Year: 2021

References

External links
 

2001 births
Living people
Sveindís Jane Jónsdóttir
Sveindís Jane Jónsdóttir
Women's association football midfielders
Sveindís Jane Jónsdóttir
Sveindís Jane Jónsdóttir
Sveindís Jane Jónsdóttir
Sveindís Jane Jónsdóttir
Sveindís Jane Jónsdóttir
UEFA Women's Euro 2022 players
VfL Wolfsburg (women) players
Frauen-Bundesliga players